Icelandic singer-songwriter Björk has embarked on eleven concert tours and has performed live at various events and television shows. After leaving her band, The Sugarcubes, Björk promoted her first album Debut (1993) through performances at various shows and award ceremonies. While starting her Debut Tour, Björk served as an opening act for U2 during their Zoo TV Tour stop at the Wembley Stadium in London. Björk performed a cover of The Rolling Stones' "(I Can't Get No) Satisfaction" with PJ Harvey at the 1994 Brit Awards. She also performed her single "Big Time Sensuality" at the inaugural MTV Europe Music Awards in Munich, while accompanied by Fluke. After the end of the tour, Björk curated her own MTV Unplugged special. Björk premiered her single "Army of Me" with a performance alongside Skunk Anansie at Top of the Pops. To promote its parent album, Post (1995), Björk started the eponymous concert tour, which saw her performing in different festivals and arenas throughout Europe, North America, Oceania, Asia and South America.

In 1997, the release of Homogenic was accompanied by a short promotional stint in clubs with Mark Bell before starting a worldwide tour. The tour was extended to 1998 after plans for a North American leg with Radiohead were canceled due to staging and production difficulties.  During the promotion of the album, she also performed "Bachelorette" at the 1997 MTV Europe Music Awards and during an appearance at Saturday Night Live. After receiving a Best Original Song nomination for "I've Seen It All", Björk performed the song at the 73rd Academy Awards, while dressed in her swan dress. To promote her fourth album Vespertine (2001), Björk embarked on a worldwide tour of opera houses and theaters, backed by a 54-piece orchestra. The following year, Björk became the first female artist to headline the Coachella Valley Music and Arts Festival. In 2003, the singer performed at several European festivals and North American arenas with her Greatest Hits Tour. While there was no tour performances for the singer’s fifth studio album, Medúlla (2004), Björk performed "Oceania" at the 2004 Summer Olympics opening ceremony, for which the song was commissioned, while in 2005, the singer performed at the Live 8 concert in Chiba, Japan.

Björk did not tour again until the Volta Tour in 2007, supporting her sixth studio album. The tour lasted two years, during which she returned to perform in Oceania and South America after more than 10 years. She once again was the headliner of major international music festivals, including Coachella, Glastonbury Festival, Big Day Out and Roskilde Festival. The tour faced many controversies due to Björk's support of Tibetan independence movement, Kosovo declaration of independence and Faroese independence movement during several performances of "Declare Independence". From 2011 until 2013, Björk embarked on her Biophilia Tour, a multimedia project which featured her seventh studio album and a series of residencies and workshops that used the eponymous app to teach children about science and musicology. The tour was documented by the 2013 documentary When Björk Met Attenborough and the 2014 concert film Björk: Biophilia Live, and featured her first performance in Africa, but was hindered by a series of vocal cords issues, for which the singer underwent surgery. Similar problems caused the cancellation of the last shows of her following tour, the Vulnicura Tour, which supported her 2015 eighth studio album. Following the schedule of her Björk Digital exhibition, the tour resumed with acoustic shows and festival performances in 2016 and 2017.

The singer supported the release of her 2017 album Utopia with a series of shows throughout Europe the following summer. In 2019, Björk announced Cornucopia, said to be her "most elaborate stage concert yet". It debuted as a residency show at the newly built The Shed cultural center in New York before traveling to Mexico and Europe. In 2021, Björk embarked on her eleventh concert tour, called Björk Orkestral, which setlist consisted of orchestral arrangements of songs from her career so far.

Concert tours

One-off performances

Broadcast performances

References

Bibliography

External links
 Bjork.com > Past > Gigography

Björk
Bjork